Wonderful Life: The Burgess Shale and the Nature of History is a 1989 book on the  evolution of Cambrian fauna by Harvard paleontologist Stephen Jay Gould. The volume made The New York Times Best Seller list, was the 1991 winner of the Royal Society's Rhone-Poulenc Prize, the American Historical Association's Forkosch Award, and was a 1991 finalist for the Pulitzer Prize. Gould described his later book Full House (1996) as a companion volume to Wonderful Life.

Summary 

Gould's thesis in Wonderful Life was that contingency plays a major role in the evolutionary history of life. He based his argument on the extraordinarily well preserved fossils of the Burgess Shale, a rich fossil-bearing deposit in Canada's Rocky Mountains, dating 505 million years ago. Gould argues that during this period just after the Cambrian explosion there was a greater disparity of anatomical body plans (phyla) than exist today. However most of these phyla left no modern descendants. All of the Burgess animals, Gould argues, were exquisitely adapted to their environment, and there exists little evidence that the survivors were any better adapted than their extinct contemporaries.

Gould proposed that given a chance to "rewind the tape of life" and let it play again, we might find ourselves living in a world populated by descendants of Hallucigenia rather than Pikaia (the ancestor of all vertebrates). Gould stressed that his argument was not based on randomness but rather contingency; a process by which historical outcomes arise from an unpredictable sequence of antecedent states, where any change in the sequence alters the final result. Because fitness for existing conditions does not guarantee long-term survival — particularly when conditions change catastrophically — the survival of many species depends more on luck than conventional features of anatomical superiority. Gould maintains that, "traits that
enhance survival during an extinction do so in ways that are incidental and unrelated to the causes of their evolution in the first place." Gould earlier coined the term exaptation to describe fortuitously beneficial traits, which are adaptive but arise for reasons other than incremental natural selection.

Gould regarded Opabinia—an odd creature with five eyes and frontal nozzle—as so important to understanding the Cambrian explosion that he wanted to call his book Homage to Opabinia. Gould wrote:

Reception

Wonderful Life quickly climbed the national bestseller lists within weeks of publication. It stimulated wide discussion regarding the nature of progress and contingency in evolution. Gould's controversial thesis was that if the history of life were replayed over again, human level intelligence would prove unlikely to ever arise again. In his review, the biologist Richard Dawkins wrote that, "Wonderful Life is a beautifully written and deeply muddled book. To make unputdownable an intricate, technical account of the anatomies of worms, and other inconspicuous denizens of a half-billion-year-old sea, is a literary tour-de-force. But the theory that Stephen Gould wrings out of his fossils is a sorry mess." The evolutionary biologist Ernst Mayr argued that Gould, "made such contingencies a major theme in Wonderful Life, and I have come to the conclusion that here he may be largely right."

Biologist  John Maynard Smith wrote, "I agree with Gould that evolution is not in general predictable. … Although I agree with Gould about contingency, I find the problem of progress harder. …  I do think that progress has happened, although I find it hard to define precisely what I mean." Philosopher Michael Ruse wrote that, "Wonderful Life was the best book written by the late Stephen Jay Gould, paleontologist and popular science writer. It is … a thrilling story that Gould tells in a way that no one else could equal."

Some of the anatomical reconstructions cited by Gould were soon challenged as being incorrect, most notably Simon Conway Morris' 1977 reconstruction of Hallucigenia. Conway Morris' reconstruction was, "so peculiar, so hard to imagine as an efficiently working beast" Gould speculated that Hallucigenia might be "a complex appendage of a larger creature, still undiscovered." It was later brought to light by paleontologists Lars Ramskold and Hou Xianguang that Conway Morris' reconstruction was inverted upside down, and likely belonged to the modern phylum Onychophora.

The ultimate theme of the book is still being debated among evolutionary biologists today.

See also 

 March of Progress (illustration)

References

External links 

 Wonderful Life - by Stephen Jay Gould
 Of tongue worms, velvet worms, and water bears - by Stephen Jay Gould
 The Cambrian "Explosion": Slow-fuse or Megatonnage? - by Simon Conway Morris
 Showdown on the Burgess Shale - by Simon Conway Morris and Stephen Jay Gould
 The disparity of the Burgess Shale arthropod fauna and the limits of cladistic analysis - by Stephen Jay Gould
 Wonderful Life (1989) - Unofficial Stephen Jay Gould Archive (Links to spam!)
 The Ediacaran experiment - by Stephen Jay Gould (Links to spam!)

1989 non-fiction books
American non-fiction books
Books about evolution
Books by Stephen Jay Gould
English-language books
Zoology books
W. W. Norton & Company books
Burgess Shale
Paleontology books